Tornik ski resort or Tornik ski center, is a mountain resort and one of the largest centers of winter tourism in Serbia, operated by public company "Skijališta Srbije". Located on the slopes of Zlatibor Mountain, it is mainly a destination for skiing. In the nearby town of Zlatibor, there are several hotels and hostels, cafes, bars and night clubs.

Features
It is located at elevations between 1,100 and 1,400 meters on the Tornik peak. It has four tracks, all covered by artificial snowing systems, with the total capacity of the about 5,400 skiers per hour. It is equipped with a six-seater chairlift, carrying 3,000 skiers per hour, and two T-bar ski lifts with total capacity of 2,400 skiers per hour. All four tracks are categorized by the International Ski Federation (FIS).

The ski resort also offers ski polygon, as well as bobsleigh rails and the tubing track. Many of the activities are also active during the summers.

Transportation
Tornik ski resort is located some 12 kilometers off the Zlatibor Highway and 15 kilometers from the town of Zlatibor.

Gallery

See also
 Tourism in Serbia

References

External links

 
 Ski resort Tornik at skiresort.info

Ski areas and resorts in Serbia
Zlatibor